All Signs of Death is a television pilot based on the 2009 novel The Mystic Arts of Erasing All Signs of Death by Charlie Huston, who also wrote the teleplay. Huston served as executive producer along with Alan Ball who directed the pilot. It was produced as part of Ball's multi-project contract with HBO.

Story
All Signs of Death tells the story of Webster "Web" Fillmore Goodhue, a typical twentysomething slacker living in Los Angeles, California who becomes a crime scene cleaner and discovers that the work helps to ease the pain of his own past trauma. However, Web soon finds himself at the center of a murder mystery that eventually puts his own life in jeopardy.

Cast
Ben Whishaw as Webster "Web" Fillmore Goodhue
Clayne Crawford as Chev
 James Read as Westin Nye

Production
Ball became aware of Huston's work through Charlaine Harris, author of the popular series of novels that inspired Ball's current HBO series True Blood. Huston and Ball became friends and one day, Huston confided that he was thinking about pitching his then latest novel as a series, to which Ball replied "I think it could be a great series," after which Huston requested that Ball have involvement with the pilot's development. Speaking of the book, Ball said "It's not so much about the crime, it's about the personal story of the central character and his journey back to being fully connected with his life after some very traumatic things. ... All Signs has a hard noir feel but it's also ironic; it's graphic and gritty but human and very moving at the same time—it is able to capture all those elements in a very distinctive tone."

On shooting the pilot, Ball has stated that he wants to stay away from the typical visual style of the crime noir genre. "The show is about contemporary Los Angeles, but not the glamorous LA, it’s about the dirty underbelly of LA," said Ball. "We’re going to try to go against the grain, away from the overlit, stylized noir for a more frantic, contemporary, naturalistic style."

Filming took place over 11 days in various parts of Los Angeles in June and July, 2010.

HBO announced on December 8, 2010 that it would not be taking All Signs of Death to series. The pilot remains unaired.

References

External links
 

HBO original programming
Television pilots not picked up as a series